Joannicius III, (c. 1700 – 1793) was Archbishop of Peć and Serbian Patriarch from 1739 to 1746 and Archbishop of Constantinople and Ecumenical Patriarch from 1761 to 1763. The ordinal number of his title is III both for his office as Serbian Patriarch and of Constantinople.

Life
Ioannis Karatzas was born in circa 1700 and belonged to the influential Phanariote family Caradja (Karatzas), of Byzantine Greek origin. He became a deacon serving Patriarch Paisius II and later he was appointed protosyncellus.

With the 1739 Treaty of Belgrade which ended the Austro–Turkish War (1737–39), the Kingdom of Serbia ceased to exist. The Ottoman sultan deposed Serbian Patriarch Arsenije IV who sided with the Habsburg monarchy during the war, and in his place appointed the Greek Joannicius, who took the title of Archbishop of Peć and Serbian Patriarch. Among the Serbs he was known as Joanikije (Јоаникије), and it was recorded at the time that he was appointed by 'the mighty [rule of the] Turk, and not by election at the [Serbian] sabor (assembly)'. The previous patriarch Arsenije IV moved to the Habsburg monarchy along with many Serbs, in what is known as the Second Great Serb Migration. Arsenije IV became Metropolitan of Karlovci, maintaining however deep connections with the Serbs who remained in the Ottoman Empire under the jurisdiction of Joannicius. Joannicius remained Serbian Patriarch until 1746, when, burdened with debts due to his high-living, he was forced to sell the title to pay his creditors.

After returning to Constantinople, in September 1747 he obtained an appointment as Metropolitan of Chalcedon. On 26 March 1761 he was elected Ecumenical Patriarch of Constantinople, an office he maintained until 21 May 1763, when he was deposed and exiled to Mount Athos.

Thanks to the support of his family, Joannicius returned from exile and obtained the revenue from the monastery of the island of Halki near Constantinople, where he died in 1793.

References

Sources

External links
 Official site of the Serbian Orthodox Church: Serbian Archbishops and Patriarchs 

1700s births
1793 deaths
Patriarchs of the Serbian Orthodox Church
Caradja family
18th-century Greek people
18th-century Ecumenical Patriarchs of Constantinople
Bishops of Chalcedon